Akuammine (vincamajoridine) is an indole alkaloid.  It is the most abundant alkaloid found in the seeds from the tree Picralima nitida, commonly known as akuamma, comprising 0.56% of the dried powder.  It has also been isolated from Vinca major.  Akuammine is structurally related to yohimbine, mitragynine and more distantly Voacangine, all of which are alkaloid plant products with pharmacological properties.

Pharmacology
Akuammine has antimalarial activity, and may be the primary constituent of P. nitida seeds responsible for this activity.

Akuammine is an opioid antagonist with low affinity, selective for the mu-opioid receptor, when tested in vitro.

References 

Tryptamine alkaloids
Alkaloids found in Apocynaceae
Phenols
Carbazoles
Carboxylate esters
Methyl esters
Mu-opioid receptor antagonists